St. Sebastian's Cathedral is the seat of the Roman Catholic Diocese of Mannar located in Mannar, Sri Lanka.

References

Churches in Mannar, Sri Lanka
Roman Catholic cathedrals in Sri Lanka
Roman Catholic churches in the Diocese of Mannar